The 2002 season in Swedish football, starting January 2002 and ending December 2002:

Honours

Official titles

Competitions

Promotions, relegations and qualifications

Promotions

Relegations

International qualifications

Domestic results

Allsvenskan

2002 Allsvenskan qualification play-off

Superettan

2002 Svenska Cupen 
Final

National team results

References 
Print

Online

 
Seasons in Swedish football